La Bachellerie is a commune in the Dordogne department in southwestern France.

Population

Notable people 
 The French sprinter, journalist and writer Guy Lagorce was born in La Bachellerie in 1937.
 Geographer and historian Thérèse Sclafert was born in La Bachellerie in 1876.

See also
Communes of the Dordogne department

References

Communes of Dordogne